Introverted Boss is a 2017 South Korean television series starring Yeon Woo-jin and Park Hye-su. It aired on cable network tvN every Monday and Tuesday at 23:00 (KST) from January 16 to March 14, 2017.

Synopsis 
Eun Hwan-ki (Yeon Woo-jin) is the CEO of a public relations company, but he is extremely shy. Due to his personality his employees do not know him well.

Chae Ro Woon (Park Hye-soo) starts working in the company of Eun Hwan-ki. She is very energetic and receives recognition for her good work, however she is interested in CEO Eun Hwan-ki and plans to reveal who he really is.

Cast

Main
Yeon Woo-jin as Eun Hwan-ki
 Park Ha-joon as young Eun Hwan-ki
The "Silent Monster" CEO of Brain public relations firm. He appears to be cold and prickly, but is actually extremely shy and sensitive, and avoids people as much as possible by hiding out in his penthouse office or by covering himself in black and wearing a hood.
Park Hye-su as Chae Ro-woon
An outgoing rookie employee who, despite her extroverted nature and excellent communication skills, is silent and lethargic introvert at home. She aims to take revenge on her boss for the death of her sister.
Yoon Park as Kang Woo-il
Lee Tae-woo as young Kang Woo-il
The warm, confident but sensitive co-CEO of Brain public relations firm and Hwan-ki's best friend. Also the fiancé of Eun Yi-soo.
Gong Seung-yeon as Eun Yi-soo 
 Seo Eun-sol as young Eun Yi-soo
Hwan-ki's sister, a chaebol heiress with an introverted personality. She has a mental illness initially instigated by her father's prolonged verbal and emotional abuse of her brother.

People in Silent Monster
Ye Ji-won as Dang Yoo-hee, a working mother
Jun Hyo-seong as Kim Gyo-ri, an employee who has crush on Se-jong
Heo Jung-min as Eom Sun-bong 
Han Jae-suk as Jang Se-jong, a new employee

People in Brain PR
Stephanie as Director Park
Jung Yi-yun as Assistant Jung
Woo-il's fan club and the elite of Brand Promotions AE
Hwang So-hee as Assistant Lee 
Woo-il's fan club and the elite of Brand Promotions AE

Others
Kim Eung-soo as Eun Bok-dong, Hwan-ki's father
Kim Ye-ryeong as Park Ae-ran, Hwan-ki's mother 
Lee Han-wi as Chae Won-sang, Ro-woon's father
Kim Mi-kyung as Ro-woon's mother
Han Chae-ah as Chae Ji-hye, Ro-woon's older sister and Kang Woo-il's lover
Lee Kyu-han as Woo Gi-ja, Ro-woon's neighborhood brother and a reporter
Jang Hee-jin as Seo Yun-jung, Hwan-ki's first love

Special appearances
Kim Junsu as Top Star (Ep. 1)
Choi Byung-mo as a presenter
Kim Ki-doo as a man in the restroom 1 (Ep. 2) / Chinese restaurant food-delivery
Jo Hyun-shik as a man in the restroom 2
Choi Joon-ho as a man in the restroom 3
Song Yung-jae as Won-sang's friend
Woo Hyun as Won-sang's friend
Seo Byung-sook as White Cloud Nursery School Director
Yoo Gun-woo as Secretary Kwak, Won-sang's secretary
Choi Eun-ho as Il-ho
Seo In-sung as Lee-ho
Lee Han-na as Si-yun
Geum Kwang-san as a people in sauna
Ji Dae-han as an advertiser for the Opera
Kim Hye-eun as Hwan-ki's psychiatrist 
Kang Nam-gil as Brain security
Kim Byung-man as Scrubber in Korean Spa (Ep. 2), Choir conductor (Ep. 4) and Orphanage Event MC (Ep. 6)
Park Yeong-gyu as Actor Hwang Young-kyu
Heo Young-ji as Young-kyu's daughter (Ep. 3)
Kim Dae-hui as Young-kyu's manager
 Park Sang-myun as Master Jin (Ep. 4)
Choi Dae-chul as Restaurant Owner (Ep. 4)
Lee Byung-joon as Rose Airlines CEO (Ep. 7)
Kim Ji-seok as Yu-hui's husband
Han Suk-joon as Yeon-jung's first love. Also a Kookmin MC

Production 
The series reunites writer Joo Hwa-mi and PD Song Hyun-wook of Marriage, Not Dating after 2 years. Song Hyun-wook also directed the 2016 hit drama Another Oh Hae-young.

The production team stated that the series would stop airing for a week, as the team would be doing extensive rewrites to the scripts in order to make improvements to the drama.

Original soundtrack

Part 1

Part 2

Part 3

Part 4

Part 5

Part 6

Part 7

Ratings
 In this table, the  represent the lowest ratings and the  represent the highest ratings.
 N/A denotes that the rating is not known.

Awards and nominations

Notes

References

External links

TVN (South Korean TV channel) television dramas
South Korean romantic comedy television series
2017 South Korean television series debuts
Television series by Studio Dragon
Television series by KBS Media
2017 South Korean television series endings
South Korean workplace television series